Mary Elizabeth Morgan-Grenville, 11th Lady Kinloss   (née Lady Mary Temple-Nugent-Brydges-Chandos-Grenville; 30 September 1852 – 17 October 1944) was a British peeress.

Biography

The eldest of the three daughters of Richard Temple-Nugent-Brydges-Chandos-Grenville, 3rd Duke of Buckingham and Chandos, and Caroline, Duchess of Buckingham and Chandos (née 
Harvey), she married Major Luis Courthorpe Morgan on 4 November 1884. Upon the death of her father on 26 March 1889, she succeeded to the Lordship of Kinloss, one of her father's subsidiary titles. (As he had no sons, his title as Duke of Buckingham and Chandos became extinct on his death, but titles in the Peerage of Scotland can pass to females).

Due to her father's role of Governor of Madras (1875-1880), she was made a Companion of the Order of the Crown of India in 1878. She had acted as the Duke's host in Madras alongside her other two sisters, her father being a widower. In addition to her role as the Duke's hostess, she was also Churchwarden of Stowe Parish church. This was a role that was also occupied by Major Thomas Close-Smith at the same time, her son in law. Her eldest daughter the Hon. Mary Close-Smith became Churchwarden after her mother's death.

After selling Stowe House in 1921, partly due to the loss of her eldest son and heir in the Great War and Stowe's high-running costs and debts, Lady Kinloss moved to Moreton Lodge, Maids Moreton. Her eldest daughter, the Hon. Caroline Mary Elizabeth Close-Smith, continued to live at Stowe, except at her husband Thomas's seat, Boycott Manor. Their descendants continue to live in the parish.

She was succeeded to the title Lady Kinloss by her 22-year-old granddaughter Mary Freeman-Grenville, 12th Lady Kinloss.

Children
 The Hon. Caroline Mary Elizabeth Morgan-Grenville, JP (26 June 1886 – 24 April 1972) – married Major Thomas Close-Smith (died 1946), of Boycott Manor, in 1909; he served as High Sheriff of Buckinghamshire in  1942
 Capt. The Hon. Richard George Grenville Morgan-Grenville, Master of Kinloss (25 September 1887 – 19 December 1914, Ploegsteert Wood)
 The Hon. Luis Chandos Francis Temple Morgan-Grenville, Master of Kinloss (10 October 1889 – 2 August 1944) – married Katherine Beatrice MacKenzie Jackman. They are the parents of Mary Freeman-Grenville, 12th Lady Kinloss.
 Lt.-Col. The Hon. Thomas George Breadalbane Morgan-Grenville (28 February 1891 – 10 January 1965)
 The Hon. Robert William Morgan-Grenville (21 July 1892 – 1988)
 Capt. The Hon. Harry Nugent Morgan-Grenville (8 January 1896 – 1979)

See also
Duke of Chandos
Duke of Buckingham and Chandos

Citations

 L. G. Pine, The New Extinct Peerage 1884-1971: Containing Extinct, Abeyant, Dormant and Suspended Peerages With Genealogies and Arms (London, U.K.: Heraldry Today, 1972), p. 44 
 Charles Mosley, editor, Burke's Peerage, Baronetage & Knightage, 107th edition, 3 volumes (Wilmington, Delaware, U.S.A.: Burke's Peerage (Genealogical Books) Ltd, 2003), volume 2, p. 2186
 Hugh Montgomery-Massingberd, editor, Burke's Irish Family Records (London, U.K.: Burke's Peerage Ltd, 1976), p. 870

References

1852 births
1944 deaths
Place of birth missing
Place of death missing
Hereditary women peers
Mary
Mary
Daughters of British dukes
Companions of the Order of the Crown of India